Avon Township may refer to 

Avon Township, Lake County, Illinois
Avon Township, Coffey County, Kansas
Avon Township, Sumner County, Kansas, in Sumner County, Kansas
Avon Township, Michigan, now Rochester Hills
Avon Township, Stearns County, Minnesota
Avon Township, North Dakota, in Grand Forks County, North Dakota

Township name disambiguation pages